Adel and Wharfedale is an electoral ward of Leeds City Council in the north west of Leeds, West Yorkshire, covering both urban and rural areas including Adel, Bramhope, Cookridge, Holt Park and Pool-in-Wharfedale.

Boundaries 
The Adel and Wharfedale ward includes the civil parishes of:
Arthington
Bramhope (part of Bramhope and Carlton Parish Council, although Carlton Parish sits in Otley and Yeadon ward)
Pool-in-Wharfedale (Pool Parish Council)

Councillors 

 indicates seat up for re-election.
* indicates incumbent councillor.

Elections since 2010

May 2022

May 2021

May 2019

May 2018

May 2016

May 2015

May 2014

May 2012

May 2011

May 2010

See also
Listed buildings in Leeds (Adel and Wharfedale Ward)

Notes

References 

Wards of Leeds